"It's Almost Tomorrow" is a 1955 popular song with music by Gene Adkinson and lyrics by Wade Buff. The song was actually written in 1953, when Adkinson and Buff were in high school. Hit versions were released in 1955 by The Dream Weavers, Jo Stafford, David Carroll, and Snooky Lanson.

The song reached No. 6 on the Cash Box Top 50, in a tandem ranking of The Dream Weavers, Jo Stafford, David Carroll, Snooky Lanson, and Lawrence Welk's versions, with The Dream Weavers and Jo Stafford's versions marked as bestsellers, while reaching No. 4 on Cash Boxs chart of "The Nation's Top Ten Juke Box Tunes", in the same tandem ranking. The song also reached No. 4 on Billboards Honor Roll of Hits, with The Dream Weavers and Jo Stafford's versions listed as best sellers.

The song was ranked No. 36 on Billboards ranking of "1956's Top Tunes", based on the Honor Roll of Hits.

The Dream Weavers version
The Dream Weavers, a singing group including writers Adkinson and Buff, recorded the most successful version of the song for Decca Records (catalog number 29683). Their version first charted in Billboard on November 12, 1955, and reached No. 7 on Billboards chart of Most Played in Juke Boxes, No. 8 on Billboards Top 100, No. 8 on Billboards chart of Best Sellers in Stores, No. 10 on Billboards chart of Most Played by Jockeys, and No. 9 on Cash Boxs chart of "The Ten Records Disk Jockeys Played Most This Week". The Dream Weavers' version also reached No. 1 on the UK's New Musical Express chart.

Jo Stafford version

Jo Stafford also released a hit version of the song in 1955 (Columbia Records catalog number 40595). Stafford's version reached No. 14 on Billboards chart of Most Played in Juke Boxes, No. 19 on Billboards Top 100, No. 25 on Billboards chart of Best Sellers in Stores, and No. 20 on Billboards chart of Most Played by Jockeys.

Other versions
Snooky Lanson released a version of the song in 1955, which reached No. 20 on Billboards Top 100, No. 20 on Billboards chart of Most Played in Juke Boxes, and No. 20 on Billboards chart of Most Played by Jockeys.

David Carroll released a version of the song in 1955, with vocals by the Jack Halloran Singers. Carroll's version reached No. 20 on Billboards chart of Most Played by Jockeys, and No. 34 on Billboards Top 100.

In the UK, the song was covered by Mark Wynter in November 1963. It was released by Pye Records as catalogue number 7N15577.  His cover version peaked at No. 12 on the UK's Record Retailer chart.

Ronnie Dove recorded the song for his One Kiss for Old Times' Sake album for Diamond Records in 1965.

Jimmy Velvet released a version in 1965, which reached No. 93 on the Billboard Hot 100 chart and No. 29 on Billboards Easy Listening chart.

See also
List of UK Singles Chart number ones of the 1950s

References

1955 singles
Jo Stafford songs
Brunswick Records singles
Columbia Records singles
Decca Records singles
Dot Records singles
Mercury Records singles
UK Singles Chart number-one singles
1953 songs
1950s ballads